The United Nations Assistance Mission in Afghanistan (UNAMA) is a UN Special Political Mission tasked with assisting the people of Afghanistan.

UNAMA was established on 28 March 2002 by United Nations Security Council Resolution 1401.

Reviewed annually, this mandate has been altered over time to reflect the needs of the country and was extended for one year, on 16 March 2023, by the UN Security Council Resolution 2678 (2023).

Resolution 2678 (2023) Stressing the important role that the United Nations will continue to play in promoting peace and stability in Afghanistan.

The Security Council also passed a second Resolution 2679 (2023) calling for an integrated and independent assessment with forward-looking recommendations for an "integrated and coherent approach" to address Afghanistan’s challenges.

The Security Council also recognized that the renewed mandate of UNAMA is consistent with its resolutions 1662 (2006), 1746 (2007), 1806 (2008), 1868 (2009), 1917 (2010), 1974 (2011), 2041 (2012), 2096 (2013), 2145 (2014), 2210 (2015), 2274 (2016), 2344 (2017), 2405 (2018), 2460 (2019), 2489 (2019), 2543 (2020), 2596 (2021), 
2626 (2022)

The United Nations has been involved in the region since 1946 when Afghanistan joined the General Assembly. Agencies such as UNICEF have been operating in Afghanistan since 1949.

Structure
UNAMA's headquarters is in Kabul and it maintains a field presence across Afghanistan, as well as liaison offices in Pakistan and Iran. The Mission has around 1,164 staff: 770 Afghan nationals, 298 international staff and 68 UNVs. (Figures from June 2021.) The Mission has offices in Bamyan, Faizabad, Gardez, Herat, Mazar-e-Sharif, Kabul, Kandahar, Kunduz, Maimana, Pul-i-Khumri, and Jalalabad. The UNAMA opened a temporary remote office in Almaty, Kazakhstan in September 2021 to continue international humanitarian cooperation as result of the Taliban takeover.

Since 2008, and following a directive of the UN Secretary-General, UNAMA is an integrated mission. This means that the Special Political Mission, all UN agencies, funds and programmes, work in a multidimensional and integrated manner to better assist Afghanistan according to nationally defined priorities.

The SRSG is responsible for all UN activities in the country and directly oversees the Security Section, Strategic Communication Service, Human Rights Section, and Peace and Reconciliation. The SRSG's Chief of Staff oversees UNAMA's Field Offices.

Two deputy Special Representatives (DSRSG) oversee the main pillars of the mission – political and developmental issues. Included under these pillars are mission sections specializing in issues such as political analysis, reporting, and outreach, and donor coordination, as well as the coordination of UN agencies funds and programmes.

Leadership
UNAMA is headed by Special Representatives of the Secretary-General (SRSG) for Afghanistan, Roza Otunbayeva, who was appointed to the post in September 2022, replacing Deborah Lyons. Nine Special Representatives have served in this capacity - Lakhdar Brahimi, (former Algerian Foreign Minister) served from October 2001 to January 2004, Jean Arnault held the post from February 2004 to February 2006, followed by Tom Koenigs from March 2006 to December 2007, Kai Eide from 2008 to 2010, Staffan di Mistura from 2010 to 2011, Ján Kubiš from 2012 to 2014, Nicholas Haysom from 2014 to 2016, Tadamichi Yamamoto from 2016 to 2020, and Deborah Lyons from March 2020 to June 2022.

 was appointed Deputy SRSG (political) in June 2022. Ramiz Alakbarov was appointed Deputy SRSG (humanitarian) in December 2020.

Political affairs
The Deputy SRSG (political) also has specific responsibility for political affairs: political outreach, conflict resolution, and regional cooperation. Responsibilities include the analysis and reporting, political affairs, Women, Peace and Security, rule of law and liaison’s offices in Islamabad and Teheran.

Development and Humanitarian Assistance
UNAMA's Deputy SRSG (humanitarian) is expected to manage UN support for development efforts in Afghanistan, including capacity building and coordination of humanitarian assistance from international bodies. , Deputy SRSG (humanitarian) Alakbarov also holds the post of UN Resident Coordinator for Afghanistan, responsible for the coordination of the work of the UN Country Team.

The UNCT in Afghanistan comprises 20 agencies, funds and programmes with offices in Afghanistan:

 FAO (Food and Agriculture  Organization)
 IFAD (International Fund for Agricultural Development)
 ILO (International Labour Organization)
 IOM (International Organization for Migration)
 OCHA (UN Office Coordination of Humanitarian Affairs)
 OHCHR*  (Office of the High Commissioner for Human Rights)
 UN WOMEN (United Nations Development Fund for Women)
 UNAIDS (United Nations program on HIV/AIDS)
 UNDP (United Nations Development Programme)
 UNESCO (United Nations Educational, Scientific and Cultural Organization)
 UNFPA (United Nations Population Fund)
 UN-HABITAT (United Nations Centre for Human Settlements)
 UNHCR (United Nations High Commission for Refugees)
 UNICEF (United Nations Children’s Fund)
 UNIDO (United Nations Industrial Development Organization)
 UNITAR (United Nations Institute for Training and Research)
 UNMAS (United Nations Mine Action Service)
 UNODC (United Nations Office on Drugs and Crime)
 UNOPS (UN Office for Project Services)
 WFP (World Food Programme)
 WHO (World Health Organization)

*OHCHR is integrated with UNAMA, working under direction of the SRSG

See also
United Nations Security Council Resolution 1267 - the Sanctions Regime against Taliban and al Qaeda.
 International Security Assistance Force (ISAF)
 War in Afghanistan (2001-2021) 
List of UN Security Council Resolutions
Bonn Agreement
United Nations
Department of Peacekeeping Operations
United Nations Development Programme
UN High Commissioner for Refugees
Hamid Karzai
Kofi Annan
Afghanistan
Afghan
Human Rights
Refugees

References

External links
UNAMA
United Nations
A Democracy Is Born: An Insider's Account of the Battle Against Terrorism in Afghanistan

1401
2000s in Afghanistan
2010s in Afghanistan
Political history of Afghanistan
War in Afghanistan (2001–2021)
Organizations established in 2002
2002 establishments in Afghanistan
Afghanistan and the United Nations